Wilhelm Carl Grimm (also Karl; 24 February 178616 December 1859) was a German author and anthropologist, and the younger brother of Jacob Grimm, of the literary duo the Brothers Grimm.

Life and work
Wilhelm was born in February 1786 in Hanau, in Hesse-Kassel.  In 1803, he started studying law at the University of Marburg, one year after his brother Jacob started there. The two brothers spent their entire lives close together. In their school days, they had one bed and one table in common; as students, they had two beds and two tables in the same room. They always lived under one roof and had their books and property in common.

In 1825, 39-year-old Wilhelm married pharmacist's daughter Henriette Dorothea Wild, also known as Dortchen. Wilhelm's marriage did not change the harmony of the brothers. Richard Cleasby visited the brothers and observed, "they both live in the same house, and in such harmony and community that one might almost imagine the children were common property."

Wilhelm's character was a complete contrast to that of his brother. As a boy, he was strong and healthy, but while growing up he suffered a long and severe illness which left him weak the rest of his life. He had a less comprehensive and energetic mind than his brother, and he had less of the spirit of investigation, preferring to confine himself to some limited and definitely bounded field of work. He utilized everything that bore directly on his own studies and ignored the rest. These studies were almost always of a literary nature.

Wilhelm took great delight in music, for which his brother had but a moderate liking, and he had a remarkable gift of story-telling. Cleasby relates that "Wilhelm read a sort of farce written in the Frankfort dialect, depicting the 'malheurs' of a rich Frankfort tradesman on a holiday jaunt on Sunday. It was very droll, and he read it admirably." Cleasby describes him as "an uncommonly animated, jovial fellow." He was, accordingly, much sought in society, which he frequented much more than his brother.

A collection of fairy tales was first published in 1812 by the Grimm brothers, known in English as Grimms' Fairy Tales.

From 1837 to 1841, the Grimm brothers joined five of their colleague professors at the University of Göttingen to form a group known as the Göttinger Sieben (The Göttingen Seven). They protested against Ernest Augustus, King of Hanover, whom they accused of violating the constitution. All seven were fired by the king.

Wilhelm Grimm died in Berlin of an infection at the age of 73 on December 16, 1859.

Children
Wilhelm and Henriette had four children together:
 Jacob (3 April 182615 December 1826)
 Herman Friedrich (6 January 182816 June 1901), also a noted writer
 Rudolf Georg (31 March 183013 November 1889)
 Barbara Auguste Luise Pauline Marie (21 August 18329 February 1919)

Notes

References

External links 

 
 Grimm Brothers' Home Page
 
 
 
 
 Household Tales by the Brothers Grimm, translated by Margaret Hunt  (This site is the only one to feature all of the Grimms' notes translated in English along with the tales from Hunt's original edition.  Andrew Lang's introduction is also included.)
 
 
 

1786 births
1859 deaths
19th-century anthropologists
19th-century German writers
19th-century German male writers
People from Hanau
German anthropologists
German lexicographers
People from the Landgraviate of Hesse-Kassel
University of Marburg alumni
Academic staff of the University of Göttingen
Members of the Prussian Academy of Sciences
 
Members of the Bavarian Academy of Sciences
Members of the Göttingen Academy of Sciences and Humanities